Otto I (1045 – 9 June 1087), known as Otto the Fair, a member of the Přemyslid dynasty, was Prince of Olomouc in Moravia from 1061 until his death.

He was the youngest son of the Bohemian duke Bretislav I and his wife Judith of Schweinfurt. After his father's death in 1055, his older brother was crowned as Duke Spytihněv II of Bohemia. Otto ruled as a Přemyslid prince in Brno, but after struggles with his brother Vratislaus of Olomouc, he took refuge in Prague. When in 1061 Spytihněv died and his brother Vratislaus was crowned duke, Otto took over the government of the Olomouc principality. Like his brothers Conrad and Bishop Jaromír of Prague, he strongly resisted against Duke Vratislaus' centralised rule.

Otto married Euphemia, a daughter of King Béla I of Hungary, before 1073. His sons were:
Svatopluk, Duke of Bohemia (d. 1109)
Otto II the Black (d. 1126)

Ancestry

Bibliography
 BLÁHOVÁ, Marie; FROLÍK, Jan; PROFANTOVÁ, Naďa. Velké dějiny zemí Koruny české I. Do roku 1197. Praha ; Litomyšl : Paseka, 1999. 800 s. .  
 NOVOTNÝ, Václav. České dějiny I./II. Od Břetislava I. do Přemysla I. Praha : Jan Laichter, 1913. 1214 s.  
 SOMMER, Petr; TŘEŠTÍK, Dušan; ŽEMLIČKA, Josef, a kol. Přemyslovci. Budování českého státu. Praha : Nakladatelství Lidové noviny, 2009. 779 s. .  
 WIHODA, Martin. Morava v době knížecí 906–1197. Praha : Nakladatelství Lidové noviny, 2010. 464 s. .  
 ŽEMLIČKA, Josef. Čechy v době knížecí 1034–1198. Praha : Nakladatelství Lidové noviny, 2007. 712 s. .  
 ŽEMLIČKA, Josef. Přemyslovci. Jak žili, vládli, umírali. Praha : Nakladatelství Lidové noviny, 2005. 497 s. .  
 Wertner Mór. (1892). Az Árpádok családi Története. Pleitz Fer. Pál Könyvnyomdája. Nagy-Becskereken. 168.

1045 births
1087 deaths
Dukes of Bohemia
Přemyslid dynasty
Roman Catholic monarchs
Younger sons of dukes
Bohemian princes